Bengre  is a village in the southern state of Karnataka, India. It is located in the Bhatkal taluk of Uttara Kannada district in Karnataka.

Demographics
As of 2001 India census, Bengre had a population of 7718 with 3672 males and 4046 females.

See also
 Uttara Kannada
 Mangalore
 Districts of Karnataka

References

External links
 

Villages in Uttara Kannada district